Bothrops osbornei is a species of venomous snake in the  family Viperidae. It is found in Ecuador and northwestern Peru.

References

osbornei
Reptiles described in 1991
Taxa named by Antonio Freire Lascano